Play is a 2002 album by Joanna MacGregor. The album was released on the SoundCircus label and was a nominee for the Mercury Music Prize.

References

  

2002 albums